The MTV Europe Music Award for Best Rock has been awarded since 1994. During the 2002 ceremony the category was separated, creating an additional award entitled Best Hard Rock Act. The category was briefly retitled to this during the 2007 and 2008 ceremonies, before reverting to its original name during the following year. Linkin Park holds the most wins, with five, followed by Coldplay with four.

Winners and nominees
Winners are listed first and highlighted in bold.

† indicates an MTV Video Music Award for Best Rock Video–winning artist.
‡ indicates an MTV Video Music Award for Best Rock Video–nominated artist that same year.

1990s

2000s

2010s

2020s

Multiple wins and nominations

See also
 MTV Video Music Award for Best Rock Video

References

MTV Europe Music Awards
Rock music awards
Awards established in 1994